James W. Webb (September 2, 1841 – June 7, 1915) was an American soldier who fought in the Union Army during the American Civil War. He received the Medal of Honor on September 17, 1897 for actions as a Private with the 5th New York Infantry during the Second Battle of Bull Run on August 30, 1862. He was born in Brooklyn, Kings County, New York. He is buried in Cypress Hills National Cemetery in Brooklyn.

Medal of Honor Citation 
Under heavy fire voluntarily carried information to a battery commander that enabled him to save his guns from capture. Was severely wounded, but refused to go to the hospital and participated in the remainder of the campaign.

References 

1841 births
1915 deaths
American Civil War recipients of the Medal of Honor
United States Army Medal of Honor recipients
People from Brooklyn
People of New York (state) in the American Civil War